Bråpiggen Peak is one of the ice-free peaks at the south side of Antarctica's Frostlendet Valley, situated  south of Friis-Baastad Peak in the Borg Massif of Queen Maud Land. It was mapped by Norwegian cartographers from surveys and from air photos by the Norwegian–British–Swedish Antarctic Expedition (1949–52) and named "Bråpiggen" (the abrupt peak).

References 

Mountains of Queen Maud Land
Princess Martha Coast